Aleksander Bajt (February 27, 1921 – February 24, 2000) was a Chetnik intelligence officer during the World War II and a Yugoslav and Slovenian economist, best known as being the most influential macroeconomist in Socialist Yugoslavia.

In Yugoslavia 
Bajt was born in 1921. During the World War II Bajthe was a member of royalist resistance movement in Yugoslavia and the main intelligence officer of General Dragoljub Mihailović in Rome, Italy.

In Slovenia 
Bajt was one of economists consulted to design model for privatization of socially owned companies in post-socialist Slovenia.

Bajt wasa  member of the Slovenian Academy of Art and Science.

Bajt's memoires 
In 1999 he published his memoirs, titled Berman's dossier in which he surprised the Slovenian public when he revealed his pro-Chetnik and pro-western activities during World War II. According to historian Kosta Nikolić, this work of Bajt is authentic and non-ideological view of events in Axis occupied Yugoslavia during WWII.

Bajt emphasized that in 1941, Communists misused and betrayed the rebellion and sacrificed the Yugoslav population to carry on the Communist revolution, also by initiating and inflaming the civil war in WWII Yugoslavia. He particularly underlined exact military operations in Eastern Bosnia (near Han Pijesak, Vlasenica and Srebrenica) and north-east of Sarajevo where Partisans helped Ustaše to fight against Bosnian Chetniks. Bajt further elaborated that the Germans allowed Partisans to escape encirclement during Operation Schwartz. He blamed British abandoning of Mihailović and his Chetniks because of the agreement Western Allies reached with Soviets. Bajt extensively elaborated about important Chetniks anti-Axis activities and how they were ignored by Western Allies, while in the same time even minor guerrilla communist actions against Axis were recognized as "major battles". Bajt concluded that without any doubt Communist Partisans are most responsible for sins they attributed to Chetniks, primarily for military and civil collaboration with occupiers and for all Yugoslav casualties.

References

Sources 

 

1921 births
2000 deaths
Writers from Ljubljana
Members of the Slovenian Academy of Sciences and Arts
Slovenian Chetnik personnel of World War II
Military personnel from Ljubljana
Yugoslav economists